Namsoi is a border town of Laos in Viengxay District, Houaphan Province. It lies near Na Meo Town of Vietnam.

Populated places in Houaphanh Province